"Things Have Changed" is a song from Mattafix's second studio album Rhythm and Hymns, released in May 2008.

Charts

References

External links
 The music video

2008 songs
Songs written by Marlon Roudette
Mattafix songs